Biasmia is a genus of longhorn beetles of the subfamily Lamiinae.

 Biasmia antennalis Hunt & Breuning, 1957
 Biasmia guttata Pascoe, 1864

References

Crossotini